Evangelical Church of Maraland is a church in southern Mizoram in northeast India. It was founded by English missionary Reverend and Mrs Reginald Arthur Lorrain (brother of missionary James Herbert Lorrain) in 1907. It is the largest church among the Mara people. It is one of the three Mizoram churches pioneered by English missionaries in the 19th century; others are Mizoram Presbyterian Church and Baptist Church of Mizoram.

History 
Prior to his arrival in British India, the Rev. Reginald Arthur Lorrain founded Lakher Pioneer Mission in 1905 in London. Two years later he arrived in Saikao (also known as Serkawr), a sleepy town in Saiha district of Mizoram. The church began as an Independent Church of Maraland (ICM) which later split into the Evangelical Church of Maraland, India ECMI and Congregational Church in India (Maraland); his ministry oversaw all the Mara-inhabited areas of British India that included Mara people in western Myanmar, which now function as a separate church under the name of Mara Evangelical Church after the partition of India in 1947.

The church held a series of celebrations for the 100th year of the Gospel to the Mara people and land in September (26 September 2007) and November 2007.

Rev. S.T. Zawsi is the present moderator of the Synod of the Evangelical Church of Maraland.

Association/membership 
The Evangelical Church of Maraland (India) is a member of
World Communion of Reformed Churches
India Evangelical Mission
All India Sunday School Union
The church had more than 30,000 members and 74 congregations in 2004.
It also has a partnership with Mara Evangelical Church in Myanmar.

Name 
The Evangelical Church of Maraland (India) continues to use the word "Maraland" signifying the un-administered part of the world. Maraland was not part of any country until the British conquered the area inhabited by the Mara people in 1922, whereas the church was already founded in 1907.

Theologians holding doctorate degrees
Rev. Dr. T. Laikai, D.D (Senate of Serampore University, India), 2004.
Rev. Dr. M. Zakonia, D.Min (United Theological Open University, India), 2002.
Rev. Dr. Laiu Fachhai, D.Th (Stellenbosch University, South Africa), 2007.
Rev. Dr. S.T. Zawsi, D.Min (University of Jerusalem, India), 2012.

See also 
Evangelical Church of Maraland (ECMI) Entry at MaraChristian.net
 Council of Baptist Churches in Northeast India
 List of Christian denominations in North East India

References

External links
The following websites contain a good articles and information on Evangelical Church of Maraland (India):
Maraland.NET: Home of Mara people on the internet
Samaw.com - First English blog from Maraland
MaraChristian.net - Mara Christian Network

Reformed denominations in Asia
Christian organizations established in 1907
Churches in Mizoram
Members of the World Communion of Reformed Churches
1907 establishments in India
Evangelicalism in India
Christianity in Mizoram
Evangelical denominations in Asia